Abu Hasan Shahriar (born 25 June 1959) is a Bangladeshi poet. He won 2016 Bangla Academy Literary Award in the category of poetry.

Works
 Antaheen Mayabee Bhomon
 Obyertha Angul 
 Tomar Kache Jai Na Tobe Jabo
 Haate Gechhe Jarabastubad
 paaye paaye
 Naihshabder DakGhar
 Tomader Kancher Shahare

References

Living people
1959 births
Bangladeshi male poets
Recipients of Bangla Academy Award
Dhaka College alumni